Willi Worpitzky (25 August 1886 – 10 October 1953) was a German footballer and manager. He competed in the 1912 Summer Olympics. Worpitzky was a member of the German Olympic squad and played one match in the main tournament.

References

External links
 
 
 
 

1886 births
1953 deaths
German football managers
German footballers
Germany international footballers
Olympic footballers of Germany
Footballers at the 1912 Summer Olympics
Footballers from Berlin
Association football forwards